Friedrich Bayer (born Friedrich Beyer, 6 June 1825 in Barmen now Wuppertal – 6 May 1880 in Würzburg) was the founder of what would become Bayer, a German chemical and pharmaceutical company. He founded the dyestuff factory Friedrich Bayer along with Johann Friedrich Weskott in 1863 in Elberfeld, a flourishing city in the early industrialised region of the Wuppertal or Wupper Valley.

Friedrich Bayer changed the spelling of his surname from Beyer in his early twenties, due to the publicity gained by a fraudulent merchant from Leipzig bearing the same name. Friedrich Beyer from Barmen feared that the bad reputation of his namesake could damage his business and consequently changed his surname to Bayer.

References

External links
Leverkusen who's who

People from the Rhine Province
Businesspeople from Wuppertal
1825 births
1880 deaths
19th-century German businesspeople
German chemical industry people
German company founders
Bayer people
Bayer family
Pharmaceutical company founders
Scientists from Wuppertal